, also written Utsu no Miko, is a Japanese historical fantasy light novel series written by Keisuke Fujikawa (藤川桂介) and illustrated by Mutsumi Inomata, which was later adapted into an anime of the same title. The story is set in the late Asuka Period to the Nara Period, and follows the trials of the title character Utsunomiko (usually shortened to Miko), the offspring of the kami of the north star. There are 52 Utsunomiko novels, the first published in 1984, and the last published in 1998. The Utsunomiko anime film premiered in 1989, followed by a second anime film and a 13-episode OVA starting in 1990.

Introduction 
In the chaos of the Jinshin War of 672, a child with a small horn in his forehead was born. The child's mother condemned him as an oni and cast him away. An elderly shūgenja woman claimed the child and named him Utsunomiko, or 'Divine Child of the Heavens', telling Miko that his horn symbolizes the union of heaven and earth. Miko matured in the wilderness learning the ways of Shugendō, and soon started venturing into villages out of curiosity. He found that the common people of the villages live in poverty and suffering, and began using his spiritual powers to help them. But his anger at the self-serving rulers and their petty power-struggles grew until he came into open conflict with the Imperial Court, setting Miko down a long path as a champion of the oppressed.

Story arcs 
 Chronicle of Earth (地上編 – Chijō-hen) – 10 volumes
 Chronicle of Heaven (天上編 – Tenjō-hen) – 10 volumes (Miko faces the rulers of the Heavenly plane and seeks his father)
 Uncanny Dream Chronicle (妖夢編 – Yōmu-hen) – 10 volumes
 Chronicle of Purgatory (煉獄編 – Rengoku-hen) – 10 volumes
 Chronicle of Dawn (黎明編 – Reimei-hen) – 8 volumes
 Gaiden Collection (拾異伝 – Shūiden) – 4 volumes

External links 
 
 Utsunomiko Data

Kadokawa Dwango franchises
1984 fantasy novels
1984 Japanese novels
1989 anime films
1990 anime films
1990 anime OVAs
Anime films based on light novels
Fantasy anime and manga
Fantasy novel series
Japanese serial novels
Light novels
Japanese fantasy novels
Nippon Animation films
Japanese-language films
Japanese novels adapted into films
Historical fantasy novels
Toei Animation films
Buddhist novels